Priscilla Strode Turner House is a historic home located at Beddington, Berkeley County, West Virginia. It was built about 1850 and is a two-story, five-bay, brick dwelling in the Greek Revival style.  It has an L-shaped plan and is topped by a gable roof.  Also on the property is a stone spring house, also dated to about 1850.  Angeline Turner, a daughter of Ehud and Priscilla Strode Turner, married Lincoln associate Ward Hill Lamon (1828 - 1893) in 1850.

It was listed on the National Register of Historic Places in 2002.

References

Houses on the National Register of Historic Places in West Virginia
Greek Revival houses in West Virginia
Houses completed in 1850
Houses in Berkeley County, West Virginia
National Register of Historic Places in Berkeley County, West Virginia